Sts. Peter & Paul Church is located at 900 S.W. 26th Road, in Miami, Florida.

History
The Sts. Peter & Paul Parish was established on December 25, 1939, to serve the spiritual needs of the areas between 8th Street and Coral Way and from 3rd Avenue to 37th Avenue. The church building was completed and dedicated in February 1940. Father Juan M. Lopez has been pastor since 1989.

The school opened on September 15, 1941, with an enrollment of 300 students in grades 1 through 9. Reverend Father Robert P. Brennan, the Pastor, obtained the services of eight Sisters of St. Joseph of St. Augustine, Florida, to staff the school with Sister St. John, S.S.J., as its first principal. The school added a grade each year. There were 17 graduates in the first high school graduation in 1946. There were 650 students in 1945 and 1200 in 1962.

The last high school graduation was in 1956. There were 47 high school graduates that year. The school has continued having 8th grade graduations.

In 2001, Sister Mary Eleanor, S.S.J., retired and the Sisters of St. Joseph of St. Augustine, Florida, could no longer staff the school so the convent was closed.

Controversy 
In February 2018 the school received criticism from parents, community members, and human rights groups after it fired a popular teacher because that teacher married a same-sex partner.

Leadership
Below are lists of individuals who have led the church and school since their founding.

Church Pastors
 Rev. Robert P. Brennan
 Rev. Francis J. Dunleavy
 Msgr. Bryan Walsh
 Rev. Thomas Barry
 Rev. Vincent Tyson
 Rev. Jose Luis Paniagua
 Rev. Juan La Calle
 Fr. Federico Capdepón V.F.
 Rev. Gilberto Fernandez
 Rev. Juan M. Lopez

School Principals
 Sister St. John Colee, SSJ. (1941–1945)
 Sister M. Evangelista Slaid, SSJ. (1945, 1946 & 1947)
 Sister Marie de Lourdes Ortego, SSJ. (1948, 1949, 1950 & 1951)
 Sister Mary Ambrose (1952 & 1953)
 Sister Mary Herbert Rogero, SSJ. (1954, 1955 & 1956)
 Sister Frances Joseph, SSJ. (1957–1960)
 Sister St. Charles Bagwell, SSJ. (1960–1962)
 Sister Louis Angela O'Donnovan, SSJ. (1962–1968)
 Sister Dorothy Flowers, SSJ. (1968–1970)
 Sister Marie Carmela, SSJ. (1970–1972)
 Sister Mary Eleanor Callaghan, SSJ. (1972–1988)
 Sister M. Trinita McCarthy, SSJ. (1988–1993)
 Sister Mary Eleanor Callaghan, SSJ. (1993–2001)
 Dr. Carlota E. Morales, EdD (2001–2019)
 Mrs. Jocelyn Zlatkin, Ed.S (2019–present)

References

External links
 Sts. Peter and Paul Catholic School Website

Roman Catholic Archdiocese of Miami
Roman Catholic churches in Miami
Roman Catholic churches in Florida
1939 establishments in Florida
Churches completed in 1940